Discrimination in awarding Section 8 housing describes cases of discrimination in the housing market of the United States of America whereby landlords refuse to rent to tenants using housing vouchers. In the United States, "Section 8" is a portion of the Housing Act of 1937 that provides financial assistance for housing costs of several million low-income Americans. 

Advocates, such as the NAACP, argue renters have been unfairly denied usage of their housing voucher and that acceptance of housing vouchers leads to more diverse communities. 

In 1968, Congress enacted the Fair Housing Act (FHA) as Title VIII of the Civil Rights Act of 1968 to combat racial segregation. In 1974, to further combat the concentration of poverty and racial segregation in housing, the government developed the Section 8 Housing Voucher Program (now known as the Housing Choice Voucher Program), which supplies vouchers to low-income tenants to assist with rental payments.

However, despite receiving vouchers to help with rental payments, participants in the program are said to still experience substantial difficulties obtaining housing. A noticeable "disparate impact" within the Section 8 Housing Voucher Program has been noted by Rotem (2010).

Under the Section 8 Housing Voucher Program, participants can use the voucher to pay a portion of their rent. However, participation in the Section 8 Housing Voucher Program is largely voluntary for landlords. 
Landlords participating in the program are free to withdraw for many reasons. According to the Fair Housing Act. 42 U.S.C. § 3604, an owner who refuses to sell or rent after the making of a bona fide offer, or to refuse to negotiate for the sale or rental of, or otherwise make unavailable, or deny for reasons associated with their tenant's "race, color, religion, sex, handicap, familial status, or national origin" would be an illegal act of discrimination. The act does not prohibit landlords from refusing to rent to people using housing vouchers. 

As neighborhoods have gentrified, holders of housing vouchers may find that property owners who might have taken their vouchers in the past are no longer doing so. A common excuse used by landlords in order to technically legally dismiss individuals with housing vouchers is to tell them that they, the landlord, are not sure about the rules and conditions regarding section 8. By responding with an unsure answer, the landlord displaces the discrimination as a technical matter.

Background 
There are more than two million households in the United States that participate in the Section 8 Housing Choice Voucher Program (the Section 8 voucher program) to afford privately owned rental housing. The Section 8 Program provides rent subsidies to low-income families who then seek out participating landlords who will rent out the property to them. Thus, the Section 8 Program is designed to reduce the barriers to obtain affordable housing for people with low incomes. There are many landlords across the country participating in this program to offer low-income families an opportunity to choose housing outside of public housing.

Under this program, the federal government provides rent subsidies to eligible low-income families who rent from participating landlords. Local Public Housing Authorities (PHAs) manage and administer the Section 8 voucher program in conjunction with the Department of Housing and Urban Development (HUD). The PHAs issue vouchers to qualifying families who then independently find suitable rental housing from private owners and landlords who voluntarily take part in the program. In order to participate in the program, landlords must meet basic housing quality standards, and must rent at rates within fair market guidelines set by HUD and the local PHA.

When a Section 8 voucher participant rents from a participating landlord, the local PHA “pays the difference between the household’s contribution (set at 30 percent of income) and the total monthly rent.”   The Section 8 voucher program does not set a maximum rent, but participants must pay the difference between the calculated subsidy and actual rent. Landlords receive the subsidy directly from the PHAs.

Examples of discrimination 
One of the major problems with the Section 8 Housing Voucher Program is that participants in the program often run into problems finding apartments to rent. In 2001, HUD conducted a study to determine the success rates of voucher holders in finding and securing apartments to rent. In the first study, in the early 1980s, 50 percent of the Section 8 Housing Voucher participants were able to find housing. This number increased to 68 percent from 1985 to 1987. There was a rise to 81 percent by 1993. However, the figures dropped to 69% success in 2000. The low success rates can be attributed to landlords declining to accept the vouchers either because of discrimination against the participants in the program or because of the burdens the program places on housing providers.

A problem with the Section 8 Housing Voucher Program, according to advocates and critics, is that participation in the program is voluntary.  There are many participants in the program who cannot find a landlord who will accept the vouchers. For example, there have been instances where a landlord is participating in the Section 8 Housing Voucher Program and then suddenly decides to withdraw from participation in the program. In a study conducted by U. S. Department of Housing and Urban Development, researchers examined the landlord denial rate of individuals with a housing voucher in neighborhoods with varying poverty rates. The researchers found that in areas where people with vouchers are considered a protected class, the denial rates are significantly lower. The areas with less outright denial of people with vouchers often tend to be the neighborhoods with higher poverty rates. Specifically, denial rates were 11to 27 percent higher in low-poverty tracts compared to high-poverty tracts. 

According to researchers, Section 8 Housing Voucher Discrimination creates barriers to people finding affordable housing opportunities. The income of families who receive vouchers is at or below 50% of the area median income, and this means these families face financial obstacles to obtaining needed goods and services. These families rely on vouchers to overcome their financial obstacles and to find affordable housing. Voucher discrimination reestablishes some of the barriers to finding affordable housing. It could be negatively hindering the federal government's goal of providing a suitable home for every American family.

Critics argue this is a type of source-of-income discrimination that occurs where landlords refuse to rent to individuals because their source of income is public assistance. Income from public assistance can include social security benefits, disability benefits, Temporary Assistance to Needy Families (TANF), or Section 8 Housing Vouchers. Some landlords have been particularly resistant to accepting tenants who use the vouchers and have subsequently adopted no-voucher policies that are similar to past discriminatory practices like the no-children policies.

Effects of discrimination 
Title VIII of the Civil Rights Act of 1968, also known as the Fair Housing Act (FHA), bars discrimination against any person in the terms, conditions, or privileges of sale or rental of a dwelling because of race. By passing the FHA, Congress intended to promote racial integration as well as nondiscrimination as national goals.  However, despite the passage of the FHA, scholars argue that pervasive racial discrimination and segregation exist within the public housing system, particularly in the Section 8 Program. One of the major problems with the Section 8 Program is that since participation in it is voluntary, many recipients are unable to find landlords to accept the vouchers. 
	
The discrimination against voucher holders is said to be a general problem. The widespread discrimination reduces the utility of the voucher program, and frustrates the purported goal of the legislation, which is to end housing segregated by race and income. In addition, while the refusal to accept the vouchers appears racially neutral on its face, many housing advocates contend that the acceptability and legality of Section 8 discrimination enable landlords to use it as a proxy for other legally prohibited kinds of discrimination, such as that based on race, ethnicity, national origin, gender, family status, or disability.  For example, studies show that the discrimination against Section 8 voucher holders increases if the recipient is African American or Latino.  
	
Thus, the Section 8 Program has not been entirely successful at ending housing segregation. Many recipients end up using their subsidies to pay for their current low-income housing units or move within their own segregated neighborhoods.  Because of discrimination against voucher holders, many subsidy recipients can only find housing in neighborhoods where they already are in the racial majority.

Disparate impact claims 
One way in which discriminated parties have dealt with discrimination is by bringing disparate impact claims. In disparate impact claims, a prima facie case of discrimination is established by showing that the challenged practice of the defendant actually or predictably results in racial discrimination. This analysis focuses on facially neutral policies that may have a discriminatory effect. Federal courts will allow claims to be made under the FHA on a disparate impact theory by analogizing the FHA to Title VII because they both share a goal of reducing discrimination.

However, courts are dividing on how they rule when it comes to allowing disparate impact claims under the FHA for voucher discrimination. A few federal courts have allowed plaintiffs who were denied housing because of their vouchers to assert these claims. Other courts have limited or prohibited them. Thus, the courts are not uniform when it comes to addressing disparate impact claims for voucher discrimination. Congress has recognized that refusing to rent to families with children violated the FHA, and it should extend that protection to people who use vouchers. Without more legal protections, voucher discrimination can continue, and the Section 8 Housing Voucher Program can be in danger of not meeting its intended goal of increasing the quantity of options and quality of housing for low-income individuals and families.

See also
Housing discrimination in the United States
Housing segregation in the United States

References

Public housing in the United States
Federal assistance in the United States
Discrimination in the United States
Affordable housing